Eupithecia pekingiana is a moth in the family Geometridae. It is found in China.

References

Moths described in 1973
pekingiana
Moths of Asia